Uranium pentachloride is an inorganic chemical compound composed of uranium in the +5 oxidation state and five chlorine atoms.

Preparation 
Uranium pentachloride can be prepared from the reaction of uranium trioxide with carbon tetrachloride, with a previously prepared amount of the compound serving as a catalyst.

4 UO3 + 10 CCl4 → 4 UCl5 + 10 COCl2 + O2
It can also be prepared from the reaction between uranium tetrachloride and chlorine in a fluidized bed reactor at 550 °C.

Properties 
Uranium pentachloride is available as red-brown microcrystalline powders or black-red crystals with metallic sheen. Unlike the tetrachloride, it is soluble in liquid chlorine. It is very hygroscopic and decomposes into uranium hexachloride and uranium tetrachloride when in water or heated. Additionally, it reacts with some organic solvents such as alcohols, acetone, diethyl ether, or dioxane, but does form stable solutions in carbon tetrachloride, carbon disulfide, and thionyl chloride.

There are two crystalline forms, each of which has the uranium atom in an octahedral geometry among six chlorine atoms. Usually, it is in the α-form, which has a monoclinic crystal structure with space group P21/n. There is also a triclinic β-form, which has space group P and consists of  dimers like in uranium pentabromide.

References 

Uranium(V) compounds
Actinide halides
Chlorides